Semans is a village in the Canadian province of Saskatchewan within the Rural Municipality of Mount Hope No. 279 and Census Division No. 10. The village is located approximately 125 km north of the City of Regina and 195 km southeast of the City of Saskatoon.

History 
Settlers first homesteaded in the Semans area as early as 1904. Semans, named for the wife of a railroad official, was one in the alphabetical sequence of towns on the Grand Trunk Railway line between Winnipeg, Manitoba and Saskatoon, Saskatchewan. A picture of the first station shows the spelling as "Semons". The first sports day was held on July 1, 1908. The railroad station and first grain elevator were built by the fall of 1908. In a little more than a year, local businesses could supply almost all necessary commodities and the population was 48 people. The first open air rink was in use by 1907. On October 28, 1908, the Semans Board of Trade sent correspondence regarding the organization of Semans under the Village Act of 1908. A petition was sent on November 4, 1908, signed by the businesses. Semans incorporated as a village on December 14, 1908.

Semans celebrated 100 years as a village with a centennial anniversary homecoming in July 2008.

Demographics 

Climate

Notable people 
 Sherwood Bassin, hockey executive in Ontario Hockey League and the Canadian National junior team
 Gordon MacMurchy, MLA for Last Mountain and Member of the Saskatchewan Order of Merit

See also 
 List of communities in Saskatchewan
 Villages of Saskatchewan

References

External links

Villages in Saskatchewan
Mount Hope No. 279, Saskatchewan
Division No. 10, Saskatchewan